Torre Château de Puerto Madero is a high-rise residential complex located in the neighborhood of Puerto Madero in Buenos Aires, Argentina.

The development began with the 2006 purchase of two, 7,000 m2 (74,000 ft²) lots in the Puerto Madero section by the Château Group, and was originally intended to include two, 48-story residential towers. The group sold the northern lot to the Madrid-based Rayet Group in 2007, however, and instead built the planned second high-rise on Avenida del Libertador (in the Núñez district).

Work on the neo-Second Empire architecture building began promptly, and by early 2009, 75% of its 190 units had been sold; among the premier real estate developments in the city, the sale price ranged from US$330 to US$470 per square foot.

External links
Château Group

References

Buildings and structures in Buenos Aires
Residential buildings completed in 2009
Residential skyscrapers in Argentina